In mathematics, a power of three is a number of the form  where  is an integer – that is, the result of exponentiation with number three as the base and integer  as the exponent.

Applications
The powers of three give the place values in the ternary numeral system.

In graph theory, powers of three appear in the Moon–Moser bound  on the number of maximal independent sets of an -vertex graph, and in the time analysis of the Bron–Kerbosch algorithm for finding these sets. Several important strongly regular graphs also have a number of vertices that is a power of three, including the Brouwer–Haemers graph (81 vertices), Berlekamp–van Lint–Seidel graph (243 vertices), and Games graph (729 vertices).

In enumerative combinatorics, there are  signed subsets of a set of  elements. In polyhedral combinatorics, the hypercube and all other Hanner polytopes have a number of faces (not counting the empty set as a face) that is a power of three. Kalai's  conjecture states that this is the minimum possible number of faces for a centrally symmetric polytope.

In recreational mathematics and fractal geometry, inverse power-of-three lengths occur in the constructions leading to the Koch snowflake, Cantor set, Sierpinski carpet and Menger sponge, in the number of elements in the construction steps for a Sierpinski triangle, and in many formulas related to these sets. There are  possible states in an -disk Tower of Hanoi puzzle or vertices in its associated Hanoi graph. In a balance puzzle with  weighing steps, there are  possible outcomes (sequences where the scale tilts left or right or stays balanced); powers of three often arise in the solutions to these puzzles, and it has been suggested that (for similar reasons) the powers of three would make an ideal system of coins.

In number theory, all powers of three are perfect totient numbers. The sums of distinct powers of three form a Stanley sequence, the lexicographically smallest sequence that does not contain an arithmetic progression of three elements. A conjecture of Paul Erdős states that this sequence contains no powers of two other than 1, 4, and 256.

Graham's number, an enormous number arising from a proof in Ramsey theory, is (in the version popularized by Martin Gardner) a power of three.
However, the actual publication of the proof by Ronald Graham used a different number.

The 0th to 63rd powers of three

See also 
 Power of 10

References

 
Integers